National Secondary Route 221, or just Route 221 (or ) is a National Road Route of Costa Rica, located in the San José, Cartago provinces.

Description
In San José province the route covers Curridabat canton (Curridabat, Granadilla, Sánchez districts).

In Cartago province the route covers La Unión canton (Tres Ríos, Concepción, Dulce Nombre districts).

References

Highways in Costa Rica